Devanahalli Venkataramanaiah Gundappa (17 March 1887 – 7 October 1975), popularly known as DVG, was an Indian writer, poet and philosopher in Kannada-language. He is one of the stalwarts of modern Kannada literature. His most notable work is the Mankuthimmana Kagga ("Dull Thimma's Rigmarole", 1943), which is similar to the wisdom poems of the late medieval poet Sarvajna.

Legacy

Published in 1943, Mankuthimmana Kagga is one of the best known of the major literary works in Kannada. The title of this work can be translated as "Dull Thimma's Rigmarole". Facing life's challenges with cheerfulness, understanding everything as a divine play, recognizing our own and others needs, honoring human aspirations and dreams, working for noble causes and above all, dissolving our ego in mature thinking are among the great thoughts that the Kagga offers. Countless similes, metaphors and multitude of choice expressions make the reading of the Kagga thoroughly delightful. Translated twice into English, this work has its renderings in Hindi and Sanskrit too. Throwing light on life in its various aspects, this inspiring literature sends out a positive message to all: live, learn, grow and be a blessing to your surroundings. DVG was a titan among Kannada writers, says Ranganatha Sharma. DVG's concern for society was incomparable and he was one of the great persons to serve ‘Kannadanadu’.

D. V. G wrote a sequel to Mankuthimmana Kagga, known as Marula Muniyana Kagga. Marula Muniyana Kagga is practically the extension of Mankuthimmana Kagga. These are the stray poems of DVG which have been collected together and published after his death. There are 825 poems in this book, 120 poems less than the number of poems in Kagga.
Like the growing tail of 
Hanuman in Lanka,
Questions and problems keep
Surging forth for this talkative,
a stammerer, Marula Muniya

No Comic story is this Kagga, nor
It is an emotional outpouring,
Stuff it is for cogitation in mind,
Enjoy each poem, one at a time, Marula Muniya

He also wrote Srimad BhagavadGeeta Tatparya, also known as Jeevana Dharma Yoga, which has received the Sahitya Akademi Award in 1967. Jeevanadharmayoga (yoga of everyday life) is an extraordinary piece of literature, which provides great solace and at the same time makes a commoner realize values of life, D.V.G has turned the great Hindu philosophical work into a common man's handbook of useful life.

Vasantha Kusumanjali was the first collection of poems of DVG. Poems on popular personalities such as nationalists, social reformers, administrators, philanthropists and their activities have been included in this collection. The pen pictures of Tilak, Gokhale, Rabindranath Tagore, Visvesvaraya, Raja Ram Mohan Roy and Gandhi highlight the characteristic qualities of the personalities depicted.
On the occasion of his birth centenary, all his works compiled in eleven volumes titled "D.V.G. Kriti Shreni", are jointly published by Department of Kannada and Culture and Karnataka Sahitya Academy. Very ably edited by late Dr. Ha.Ma. Nayak the volumes were published between 1990 and 2000. A second edition was brought out in 2005 CE.

DVG served as the president of the 18th Kannada Sahitya Sammelana (Literary Conference) held in Madikeri in 1932.

DVG was a pioneer in writing biography in Kannada. He knew well that human traits were basic material for both creative writing and writing of biography. The book Dadabhai Navaroji that he wrote in 1950 is in a way his experiment with biographical writing. The first biography of Rangacharlu by DVG virtually reveals the author's abounding interest in politics, his deep public sympathy and his faith firmly rooted in democracy. These very values of the author were reiterated in his second biography of Gopalakrishna Gokhale.

Other than the biography of Diwan Rangacharlu, the biography of Gopalakrishna Gokhale by DVG is a much appreciated one. Gopalakrishna Gokhale had immense influence on DVG. He was in total agreement with Gokhale's principle, namely, "Public life must be spiritualized". This very fact led him to found the Gokhale Institute of Public Affairs later. In the preface to the biography, DVG wrote "I have written this book to enuciate some principles, ends and means in which I have full faith, implementation of which would do good to the people and society."
Gokhale lived a frugal life. This quality along with the undivided commitment to finish the works being undertaken, heavily influenced DVG throughout his life. The biography of Gokhale saw many reprints and it was also prescribed as a textbook. Selected lectures of Gokhale were later added to it.

DVG founded the Gokhale Institute of Public Affairs GIPA) located in Bull Temple Road, Basavanagudi and promoted fine arts of India. Sri Nittoor Srinivasa Rao, The then Chief Justice of Karnataka, Masti Venkatesa Iyengar, V.T.Srinivasan, the Principal of Vijaya College, Bengaluru were some of his close associates.
DVG died on 7 October 1975. The road where his residence existed in Nagasandra road has been renamed as DVG Road in Basavanagudi.

Journalism
DVG started his career in journalism in 1906–07. He started Kannada newspapers "Bharat" and "Karnataka". DVG started a weekly called "Sumathi" and a publication division called "Sumathi Granthamale"  under which a dozen small books were published in the course of eight months. The biography of Diwan Rangacharlu was highly appreciated out of these."The Karnataka" started off as an English magazine to be published twice every week. With Diwan Visvesvaraya's help, he published the first issue of  "The Karnataka" on 2 April 1913. After about a year, "The Karnataka" started publishing articles in Kannada. Many important books got an opening in the paper. The English paper earned him a lot of respect and honour from all quarters. DVG was forced to close the paper in 1921 due to want of sufficient support.

The book called Vrutta Patrike which was published in 1928 contained the codified quintessence of newspaper publication.

Among his books, the one on Political Science published in 1952 can be said to be his tour de force. The rich experience he earned through years of keen observation of state administration, deep study of books of important western political thinkers and his own political formulations have gone into the making of this book. This is the first book of its kind to be published in Kannada. It deals with a variety of subjects relating to formation of state, characteristics of a responsible government, the concept of freedom, freedom of the people, weaknesses of democracy, impact of franchise, fundamental rights and economic policies and principles. A comprehensive coverage apart, the book contained forthright expression of opinions, and is occupying libraries even now as an ideal book of reference for students of political science. In fact, D. V. Gundappa established the Gokhale Institute of Public Affairs (GIPA) at Bengaluru to facilitate a central meeting place for intellectuals, common folk, people with dissenting ideas and ideologies and critics to assemble under one roof to deliberate upon and discuss social issues with a democratic spirit. Gokhale Institute of Public Affairs is today chaired and managed by noted intellectual, writer and journalist S. R. Ramaswamy who shared a close proximity to D. V. G. for several years.

A nationalist shall not merely have control over the weaknesses of political nature but would cultivate the qualities of politeness and cordiality. Power without the fear of inquiry is like pickles without salt that would degenerate into a pit of worms, according to DVG. The fear of inquiry is the bodyguard of power administration. DVG has also written two books of the same genre, namely, Principles of Constitution and Probity in Public Life.

The first book traces the development of political science in the west in comparison with its growth in the east. It prescribes a standard of minimum education required for administration and citizens. The second one explains in delicate terms the political situation obtaining at present. It is normal nature of man not to exert himself. "Be relaxed, not to bother yourself, let it happen whatever that happens."

Awards and honours

Gundappa was awarded Padmabhushan by the Government of India in 1974. The State of Karnataka under Chief Minister Sri Veerandra Patil honored him for his services to Kannada literature in 1970 at Ravindra Kalakshetra, Bengaluru and awarded a purse of Rs 90,000. DVG donated the entire award money to the Gokhale Institute of Public Affairs. India Post issued a commemorative stamp of Dr. Gundappa in 1988.

In 2003, a statue was erected to honor DVG in Bugle Rock Park, Basavanagudi.

Publications

Poetry
Vasantha Kusumanjali (1922)
Nivedana (1942)
Kavite
Umarana Osage
Mankuthimmana Kagga
Marula Muniyana Kagga
Shri Rama PareekShaNaM
Antahpura Geete
Geetha Shaakuntala
Kethaki Vana (1973)
"Gauravisu Jeevanava"

Essays
Jeevana saundarya mattu saahitya
Saahitya Shakti

Baaligondu Nambike

Drama (ನಾಟಕ)
Vidhyaranya Vijaya
Jack ked
Macbeth
Kanakaaluka
Tilottamey

Biography
Diwan Rangacharlu
Gopalakrishna Gokhale
Vidyaranyara Samakaleenaru
Jnapaka chitra shaale 1 to Jnapaka chitra shaale 6
Halavu mahaneeyaru
Mysorina Divanaru
Kalopasakaruu

Political science
Rajyanga Tattvagalu
Rajakeeya Prasangagalu 1 & 2
Rajya Shastra
Vrutta Patrike
Principles of Constitution
Probity in Public Life

Spiritual 
Purushasookta
Devaru
Rutha, Satya mattu Dharma
Ishopanishat

Children's literature
Indravajra
Bekkoji

e-Publications
Gokhale Institute of Public Affairs has brought out all publications of D. V. Gundappa in the form of eBooks.

See also
 B. G. L. Swamy

References

Cited sources

External links

Gokhale Institute of Public Affairs
eBooks of D. V. Gundappa
Letters and Correspondences of D.V. Gundappa
D.V. Gundappa
The Gita for Every Man

1887 births
1975 deaths
Kannada-language writers
Recipients of the Padma Bhushan in literature & education
People from Kolar district
Recipients of the Sahitya Akademi Award in Kannada
20th-century Indian philosophers
Kannada poets
Translators of Omar Khayyám
20th-century Indian translators
20th-century Indian poets
Indian male writers
Writers from Karnataka